Vildan Atasever (born 26 July 1981) is a Turkish film, TV and theatrical actress.

Biography
Vildan Atasever was born on 26 July 1981 in Bursa, Turkey. She started acting at the age of fifteen. Her first major part was in the hit revenge series Kadın İsterse where she played Hülya Avşar's daughter. She played Handan in the film İki Genç Kız (Two Young Girls), also as Hülya Avşar's daughter, and won 2005 the Golden Orange award for Best Actress in the Leading Role. She also played the role of Hümaşah Sultan in Muhteşem Yüzyıl: Kösem, a sequel of the 2011 television period drama Muhteşem Yüzyıl. This is the third time she played a role as Hülya Avşar's daughter.

She has appeared together with her former spouse İsmail Hacıoğlu in two TV series, Gece Sesleri and Osmanlı Tokadı and film Meryem. In 2006, she was nominated again for her performance in Kader, which won the Golden Orange for Best Film and earned her the Ankara Film Festival award for Best Actress. She played in popular series "Bıçak Sırtı" alongside Mehmet Günsür, Nejat İşler, Melisa Sözen, Canan Ergüder.

Filmography

Awards 
 2005 – Golden Orange award, Best Actress (İki Genç Kız)
 2007 – Ankara Film Festival, Best Actress (Kader)
 2015 – Sadri Alışık Theater and Cinema Awards, Best Actress in a Supporting Role (Gece)

References

 Biyografi.info - Biography of Vildan Atasever

External links

 

1981 births
People from Bursa
Living people
Turkish film actresses
Best Actress Golden Orange Award winners